Simple Dreams is the eighth studio album by the American singer Linda Ronstadt, released in 1977 by Asylum Records.  It includes several of her best-known songs, including her cover of the Rolling Stones song "Tumbling Dice" (featured in the film FM) and her version of the Roy Orbison song "Blue Bayou", which earned her a Grammy nomination for Record of the Year.  The album also contains covers of the Buddy Holly song "It's So Easy!" (a top-5 hit) and the Warren Zevon songs "Poor Poor Pitiful Me" (another top-40 hit) and "Carmelita". The album was the best-selling studio album of her career, and at the time was the second best-selling album by a female artist (behind only Carole King's Tapestry).  It was her first album since Don't Cry Now without long-time musical collaborator Andrew Gold, though it features several of the other Laurel Canyon-based session musicians who appeared on her prior albums, including guitarists Dan Dugmore and Waddy Wachtel, bassist Kenny Edwards, and producer and multi-instrumentalist Peter Asher.

Release and promotion
The album was originally released by Asylum in the LP format in September 1977 (catalogue number 104 or 6E-104). Later, in 1986, Asylum released the album in the Cassette format (TCS-104) and in the CD format (2-104). The album has never been out of print.

One of the most successful albums of Ronstadt's career, Simple Dreams spent five successive weeks at number 1 on the Billboard album chart in late 1977, displacing Fleetwood Mac's Rumours after it had held that position for a record-breaking 29 weeks. It also knocked Elvis Presley out of the number 1 position on the Billboard Country Albums chart after "The King" had held it for fifteen consecutive weeks following his death in August. Simple Dreams was Ronstadt's fifth consecutive million-selling platinum album and sold over 3½ million copies in less than a year in the United States alone—a record for a female artist. Among female recording artists at that time, only Carole King, with her album Tapestry, had sold more copies of one album.

The album was such a success that Ronstadt became the first female artist—and the first act overall since The Beatles—to have two singles in the top five at the same time: the Platinum-certified "Blue Bayou" (#3 Pop, #3 Adult Contemporary, and #2 Country) and "It's So Easy" (#5 Pop). "It's So Easy" was originally recorded by Buddy Holly and The Crickets in 1958 but had failed to chart in its original version. It was Ronstadt's second cover of a Holly song to become a hit in as many years; she had taken a rousing cover of "That'll Be the Day" to #11 Pop in 1976, using a similar arrangement.

The album includes songs by Warren Zevon, Eric Kaz, and J.D. Souther, as well as The Rolling Stones' "Tumbling Dice". Ronstadt was joined by Dolly Parton on the traditional ballad "I Never Will Marry", which became a Top 10 Country hit during the summer of 1978. (Ronstadt, Parton, and Emmylou Harris were also working on an ill-fated collaborative project around this same time, but nine years would pass before the release of their first Trio album.)

Ronstadt also recorded a Spanish-language version of "Blue Bayou" entitled "Lago Azul" only released as a single in 1978 (Asylum E-45464). The album's 40th anniversary reissue in 2017, augmented by the addition of four live tracks, likewise omits this recording.

Originally, the cover photograph was to show Ronstadt dressed in a mini-slip and seated in front of multiple mirrors. Uncomfortable with the physical exposure, she changed into a robe, and the picture was made artificially grainy. A retouched photo from the original photo sessions was included on the inner sleeve of her platinum-plus album Greatest Hits, Volume 2, released in 1980. At the 20th Grammy Awards, John Kosh won the Grammy Award for Best Recording Package for Simple Dreams.

Critical reception 

Reviewing in Christgau's Record Guide: Rock Albums of the Seventies (1981), Robert Christgau wrote:

Accolades
"Blue Bayou" was nominated for the Record of the Year Grammy award in early 1978. It also earned Ronstadt a Grammy nomination for Best Pop Vocal Performance Female, alongside Barbra Streisand, Dolly Parton, Carly Simon, and Debby Boone.

Track listing

Personnel 
 Linda Ronstadt – lead vocals, backing vocals (1, 10), acoustic guitar (5, 10), arrangements (5, 10)
 Dan Dugmore – acoustic guitar (1, 2, 7), steel guitar (3, 6), electric guitar (9)
 Waddy Wachtel – electric guitar (1, 2, 7, 8, 9), backing vocals (1, 2, 9), acoustic guitar (2, 5, 6, 8), slide guitar solo (9)
 Mike Auldridge – dobro (5, 10)
 Don Grolnick – clavinet (1, 7), organ (2), electric piano (3, 6), acoustic piano (4, 9) 
 Kenny Edwards – bass guitar (1, 2, 3, 6-9), backing vocals (1, 2, 6, 7, 9, 10), mandolin (6)
 Rick Marotta – drums (1, 2, 3, 6, 7, 9), syndrums (2, 6, 7), shaker (3), cowbell (6)
 Steve Forman – marimba (6)
 Peter Asher – backing vocals (1, 8, 10), tambourine (7), maracas (7)
 David Campbell – string arrangements (3), viola (3)
 Dennis Karmazyn – cello (3)
 Charles Veal – violin (3)
 Richard Feves – double bass (3)
 Dolly Parton – harmony vocals (5)
 Don Henley – backing vocals (6)
 Larry Hagler – backing vocals (7)
 JD Souther – backing vocals (8)
 Herb Pedersen – backing vocals (10)

Production 
 Producer – Peter Asher
 Recorded and Mixed by Val Garay
 Recording and Mix Assistant – Mark Howlett
 Mastered by Doug Sax at The Mastering Lab (Hollywood, CA).
 Art Direction and Design – Kosh
 Photography – Jim Shea

Charts

Weekly charts

Year-end charts

Certifications and sales

References

1977 albums
Linda Ronstadt albums
Albums arranged by David Campbell (composer)
Albums produced by Peter Asher
Asylum Records albums